The Dunlap House is a historic house at 101 Grandview Avenue in Clarksville, Arkansas.  It is a two-story wood frame American Foursquare structure, set on a tall stone foundation on a highly visible lot near the city center.  Its porch, uncharacteristic for the Foursquare style, extends only across half the front, and curves around to the left side; it is supported by Tuscan columns.  The house was built about 1910 to a design by noted Arkansas architect Charles L. Thompson.

The house was listed on the National Register of Historic Places in 1982.

See also
National Register of Historic Places listings in Johnson County, Arkansas

References

Houses on the National Register of Historic Places in Arkansas
Colonial Revival architecture in Arkansas
Houses completed in 1910
Houses in Johnson County, Arkansas
National Register of Historic Places in Johnson County, Arkansas